Water Under the Bridge is a 1980 miniseries based on the 1977 novel by Sumner Locke Elliott.

The budget was $1.5 million. The story follows Neil Atkins, a man torn between his goals and the women surrounding him.

References

External links

1980s Australian television miniseries
1980 Australian television series debuts
1980 Australian television series endings